Curial may refer to:

 one of the Curiales, a social class in ancient Rome
 anything related to the Roman Curia
 anything related to a royal court
 a title character of Curial e Güelfa
 Napoléon Joseph Curial (1809–1861), French peer and politician
 Philibert Jean-Baptiste Curial (1774–1829), general in the French army during the Napoleonic Wars